Coleen may refer to:

People
Coleen Garcia (born 1992), Filipina actress and host
Coleen Gray (1922–2015), American actress
Coleen Rooney (born 1986), wife of Wayne Rooney
Coleen K. Menlove (born 1943), Mormon leader
Coleen Nolan (born 1965), singer
Coleen Rowley (born 1954), FBI agent and politician
Coleen Seng (born 1936), politician
Coleen Sommer (born 1960), American high jumper
Coleen Sterritt (born 1953), Los-Angeles-based artist

Other
Coleen River

See also
 Colleen (disambiguation)
 Colen, surname
 Coolen, surname